Gogic may refer to:

Alex Gogić, Cypriot footballer
Goran Gogić (1986–2015), Serbian footballer
Siniša Gogić (born 1963), Serbian-born Cypriot footballer